The Cenderawasih languages, approximately synonymous with West New Guinea languages, are a branch of Austronesian languages of Indonesia, found in the islands and shoreline of Cenderawasih Bay in the provinces of West Papua and Papua.

Most of the languages are only known from short word lists, but Biak is fairly well attested.

Languages

Biakic: Biak (Numfor), Dusner, Meoswar, Roon
Yapen (see)
Southwest: Yaur–Iresim, Yeretuar

South Halmahera–West New Guinea languages
Languages of western New Guinea
Cenderawasih Bay
Papua (province) culture